The Moneychanger is a 2019 Uruguayan comedy film directed by Federico Veiroj. It was selected as the Uruguayan entry for the Best International Feature Film at the 92nd Academy Awards, but it was not nominated.

Plot
In the 1970s, ambitious Humberto Brause agrees to a dubious money laundering scheme.

Cast
 Dolores Fonzi as Gudrun
 Benjamín Vicuña as Javier Bonpland
 Daniel Hendler as Humberto Brause
 Germán de Silva as Moacyr
 Eugenia "China" Suárez as Graciela
 Marcos Valls as Waldemar

See also
 List of submissions to the 92nd Academy Awards for Best International Feature Film
 List of Uruguayan submissions for the Academy Award for Best International Feature Film

References

External links
 

2019 films
2019 comedy films
Uruguayan comedy films
2010s Spanish-language films
Films set in Uruguay
Films shot in Argentina